Khalat Asaad Mustafa Al-Zebari (born 12 August 1996) is an Iraqi football and futsal player who plays as a goalkeeper for the Iraqi club Al-Zawraa.

International career
Khalat Al-Zebari has been capped for Iraq at senior level in both football and futsal.

In football, she represented Iraq in the 2018 AFC Women's Asian Cup qualification in 2017, where she played five games.

In futsal, Khalat Al-Zebari was selected by coach Shahnaz Yari as one of the 14 players to compete in the WAFF Women's Futsal Championship in 2022. Iraq won its first title after beating Saudi Arabia in the final.

Honours
Iraq (futsal)
 WAFF Women's Futsal Championship: 2022

See also
 Women's football in Iraq

References

1996 births
Living people
Iraqi women's footballers
Iraqi women's futsal players
Women's association football goalkeepers
Iraq women's international footballers